Ben Conneely (born 1996) is an Irish hurler who plays for Offaly Championship club St Rynagh's and at inter-county level with the Offaly senior hurling team. He usually lines out as a centre-back.

Career

Born in Banagher, County Offaly, Conneely first came to hurling prominence at juvenile and underage levels with the St Rynagh's club. He eventually progressed onto the club's senior team and has since won two County Championship titles. Conneely first appeared on the inter-county scene during a two-year stint with the Offaly minor team before later lining out with the under-21 team. He made his first appearance with the Offaly senior hurling team during the 2016 Leinster Championship.

Honours

St Rynagh's
Offaly Senior Hurling Championship: 2016, 2019 Offaly Senior Hurling championship {2020} Offaly senior hurling championship {2021}

Offaly
Christy Ring Cup: 2021 (c)
National Hurling League Division 2A: 2021 (c)

References

External links
 Ben Conneely appearance record

1996 births
Living people
St Rynagh's hurlers
Offaly inter-county hurlers